Daramola is a surname. Notable people with the surname include:

 Bimbo Daramola (born 1967), Nigerian scientist and politician
 Foluke Daramola (born 1978), Nigerian actress

Surnames of Nigerian origin